The 1896 Latrobe Athletic Association season was their second season in existence. The team finished 7–3.

Schedule

Game notes

References

Latrobe Athletic Association
Latrobe Athletic Association seasons